Daniel Chacón may refer to:

 Daniel Chacón (writer), American writer
 Daniel Chacón (footballer), Costa Rican professional footballer